The 14207 / 14208 Padmavat Express is a mail and passenger express train on the Indian Railways.

The main towns along the route are Delhi, Ghaziabad, Hapur, Moradabad, Rampur, Bareilly, Shahjahanpur, Hardoi, Lucknow, Bachhrawan, Rae Bareli, Jais, Gauriganj, Amethi, Partapgarh. The train line operates on a daily basis and covers a distance of 659 kilometres from Delhi to Pratapgarh. The Padmavat Express consists of 1 First AC Cum Second AC coach, 1 Second AC coaches, 2 Third AC coaches, 8 Sleeper Class coaches, General (Un-Reserved) coaches, SLR.

Route and halts

Traction
It is hauled by a Ghaziabad-based Indian locomotive class WAP-1, WAP-4, WAP-7 locomotive for entire journey.

Rake sharing
The train shares its rake with 14205/14026 Faizabad Delhi Express.

Schedule details

References 

Transport in Delhi
Named passenger trains of India
Rail transport in Delhi
Rail transport in Uttar Pradesh
Transport in Pratapgarh, Uttar Pradesh
Express trains in India